The R286 road is a regional road in Ireland. It is largely a loop road from the N16 linking Sligo and north County Leitrim.

In Sligo, the road passes Sligo University Hospital on The Mall. Leaving Sligo, the road goes east via Hazelwood, St. Angela's College and Colgagh Lough before reaching the north shore of Lough Gill and entering County Leitrim. The road passes Parke's Castle before turning northeast to end at the N16.

See also
Roads in Ireland

References

Regional roads in the Republic of Ireland
Roads in County Sligo
Roads in County Leitrim